Brady Township may refer to:

 Brady Township, Kalamazoo County, Michigan
 Brady Township, Saginaw County, Michigan
 Brady Township, Williams County, Ohio
 Brady Township, Butler County, Pennsylvania
 Brady Township, Clarion County, Pennsylvania
 Brady Township, Clearfield County, Pennsylvania
 Brady Township, Huntingdon County, Pennsylvania
 Brady Township, Lycoming County, Pennsylvania

Township name disambiguation pages